"Light Up My Life" is a Japanese-language song recorded by Japanese singer songwriter Mai Kuraki, taken from her twelfth studio album Kimi Omou: Shunkashūtō (2018).. It was released on March 16, 2018 by Northern Music and served as the theme song to the role-playing video game Valkyria Chronicles 4. The song was written by Kuraki herself, shilo and Shuho Mitani.

Track listing

Credits and personnel
Credits adapted from here.

Mai Kuraki – vocals, backing vocals, writer
shilo - writer
Shuho Mitani – writer
Koichiro Muroya - violin
Takayuki Yoshimura - piano
Naoki Kobayashi - bass
Kanonji – production, executive producer

Charts

Weekly charts

Release history

References

2018 singles
2018 songs
Mai Kuraki songs
Songs written by Mai Kuraki
Song recordings produced by Daiko Nagato